The Nenets Herding Laika (Russian: Ненецкая лайка) also known as the reindeer spitz, is an aboriginal spitz landrace of dog originating from the Yamalo-Nenets Autonomous Okrug, in Russia. Unlike other laikas, Nenets Herding Laika are less commonly used for hunting.  Instead they have been selected primarily for reindeer herding ability, originally by the Nenets people, and later by reindeer herders through Russia.  Nenets herding laika are thought to be the progenitor of several modern breeds, the most well-documented being the Samoyed. Despite this, the breed almost died out during the Soviet era due to lack of interest in preserving genetically purebred examples. In 1994, the Russian Kynologic Federation (RKF) approved the first official standard of the breed.

Description 
Nenets Herding Laika are small to medium-sized dogs with a thick double coats that are either solid or bicolored, coming in grey, tan, red, black or white. They come in two coat lengths, a long-haired coat called “erre” and a short-haired coat called “yando,” and they should retain a well developed coat through the summer. Regardless of coat length, the guard hairs should be straight, stiff and long, with a luxurious, soft undercoat.  Differences between the sexes should be apparent. 

Nenets Herding Laika should impart harmonious functionality and undemanding resilience. They should have well developed muscles, a moderate wedge-shaped head with small, prick ears and a tail that curves over the back or is kept down depending on mood. Nenets Herding Laika are confident, energetic dogs who are learn quickly and strive to please their humans.

History 

The Nenets Laika is one of the oldest dog breeds, surviving from the Paleolithic era to the present day almost unchanged.  Prized for their efficiency as a reindeer herding dog, by the 1930s Nenets Herding Laika had spread across the Arctic circle, stretching from the Kola Peninsula to Chukotka. Though the Nenets people themselves traditionally used reindeer to haul their sleds, several arctic explorers would use Nenets Herding Laika as sled dogs, most notably Russian painter and explorer Alexandr Borisov and Norwegian explorer and scientist Fridtjof Nansen. The all-white surviving dogs from Nansen’s Fram expedition would form the foundation stock of the Samoyed.

As infrastructure and mechanized travel made Arctic regions more accessible, non-native dogs began to intermix with the Nenets Herding Laika population. This, combined with a prevalent belief that only registered purebred dogs had any value, contributed to Nenets Herding Laika’s decline. Near the end of the Soviet era, it was widely believed there were no pure Nenets Herding Laika remaining. Fortunately, several small populations were discovered after the fall of the Iron Curtain and efforts are underway to preserve the breed in Russia. However the breed continues to be virtually unknown outside of Russia and Norway. There are currently estimated to be around 2000 purebred Nenets Herding Laika herding reindeer in Yamalo-Nenets Autonomous Okrug. 

In recent years, Nenets Herding Laika have shown proficiency in search and rescue. The Sulimov jackal-dog hybrids used for bomb detection in Moscow International Airport are part Nenets Herding Dog.  In 1994, the Russian Kynologic Federation (RKF) approved the first official standard of the breed.

References 

Breeds originating from Indigenous people